Eloy Salgado is a retired American soccer forward who played professionally in the Major Indoor Soccer League, National Professional Soccer League and USISL.

Professional
In 1988, Salgado graduated from Lewisville High School where he was a 1988 Parade Magazine All American High School soccer player.  On June 17, 1988, the Dallas Sidekicks selected Salgado in the third round (twenty-eight) overall of the Major Indoor Soccer League draft.  He played three seasons for the Sidekicks.  Salgado spent the summers of 1990 and 1991 with the Richardson Rockets of the SISL.  In August, the Rockets finished runner up to the Brooklyn Italians in the 1991 U.S. Open Cup.  In September 1991, Salgado signed with the Tulsa Ambush of the National Professional Soccer League.  In the fall of 1992, of the Detroit Rockers signed Salgado for the upcoming NPSL season.  On February 25, 1993, the Rockers traded him and their first round draft pick to the Milwaukee Wave in exchange for Joey Kirk.  In 1994, Salgado began the summer outdoor season with the Dallas Rockets, but joined the Houston Force of the American Professional Soccer League.  The Force played one game, then folded.  That fall, Salgado began the indoor season with the Wave, then left the team in December for family reasons.  In August 1995, he returned to professional soccer with the Houston Hotshots of the Continental Indoor Soccer League.  At the end of the CISL season, Salgado returned to the Milwaukee Wave.  On December 22, 1995, the Wave traded him to the Chicago Power for Tony Sanneh.  On March 7, 1995, the Power then traded him to the Kansas City Attack for "future considerations."  Salgado played for the Attack until sold to the Montreal Impact in February 1998.  In 1998, he signed as free agent with the Sidekicks, playing only one game for them in the Premier Soccer Alliance.  In October 1999, Salgado joined the Harrisburg Heat of the NPSL.  On February 19, 2000, the Heat sent Salgado to the St. Louis Ambush for Ian Carter.

International
In 1987, Salgado played for the United States men's national under-20 soccer team during a tour of Europe.  He was also a member of the U.S. soccer team with won the 1991 Pan American Games gold medal.

References

External links
 Dallas Sidekicks: Eloy Salgado

Living people
1970 births
American soccer players
American Professional Soccer League players
Chicago Power players
Dallas Rockets players
Dallas Sidekicks (original MISL) players
Detroit Rockers players
Continental Indoor Soccer League players
Harrisburg Heat players
Houston Force players
Houston Hotshots players
Major Indoor Soccer League (1978–1992) players
National Professional Soccer League (1984–2001) players
Milwaukee Wave players
Parade High School All-Americans (boys' soccer)
Premier Soccer Alliance players
St. Louis Ambush (1992–2000) players
Tulsa Ambush players
USISL players
Association football forwards
Pan American Games gold medalists for the United States
Pan American Games medalists in football
Medalists at the 1991 Pan American Games
Footballers at the 1991 Pan American Games